The Bold and the Beautiful is an American television soap opera. It was first broadcast on March 23, 1987 and airs on CBS. The following is a list of characters that first appeared or will appear in the soap in 2015, by order of first appearance. All characters are introduced by the series' executive producer and head writer Bradley Bell.

Nicole Avant

Nicole Avant, played by Reign Edwards, first appeared January 16, 2015. The character and casting was announced on December 2, 2014. Edwards auditioned for the part and noted that she was the youngest there. Despite feeling good about her audition, she did not expect to be cast. As of May 2018, Edwards is on recurring capacity with the soap.

Nicole is the younger sister of established character Maya Avant (Karla Mosley). Edwards said the sisters share a few similarities, but they would "have their differences". She added "I think Nicole is going to bring something pretty cool to the table for everybody."

Nicole turns up at Forrester Creations looking for her older sister, Maya. She later finds her at the house, and explains she is now living in LA and attending UCLA. Weeks later, Nicole returns and asks Maya if she can stay with her, as she has lost her apartment. Maya's partner, Rick Forrester (Jacob Young), tells her she can stay with them, but Maya says Nicole is fine and sees her out. Nicole later returns and Rick invites her to move in, after learning she is staying on a friend's couch. Nicole and Maya talk and attempt to reconcile their differences. During a confrontation, Nicole tells Maya that she knows she was born a boy named Myron and has transitioned.

Sasha Thompson

Sasha Thompson, played by Felisha Cooper, first appeared December 14, 2015. In January 2017, Cooper was put on recurring status with the show.

Sasha arrives in Los Angeles and is reunited with the Avant family. While Vivienne Avant (Anna Maria Horsford) is delighted to see her, Julius Avant (Obba Babatundé) seems bothered that she unexpectedly shows up. When Vivienne leaves for a job interview at the DMV, Sasha and Julius have a somewhat awkward yet very tense conversation. Julius countless times tells Sasha to go back home to Chicago, but Sasha insists she stay in town.
Soon, Sasha is reunited with her childhood best friend, Nicole Avant (Reign Edwards). Nicole brings Sasha over to Forrester Creations to give her the tour and to introduce to her boyfriend Zende Forrester Dominguez (Rome Flynn). Nicole also reveals to Sasha that she is pregnant, serving as the surrogate for Rick Forrester (Jacob Young) and Maya Avant (Karla Mosley).

When Nicole leaves for a moment, Sasha eyes an elegant dress and decides to try it on. While she begins changing, Zende walks in and believes Nicole is behind the changing wall but is stunned to see Sasha wearing only her bra and underwear. Sasha begins showing interest in Zende, not knowing that who he is and he is dating Nicole.

Later on, Sasha arrives at the Forrester mansion and is reunited with the entire Avant family, including Maya. Julius continues to show disgust that Sasha is in town and once again tells her to leave and go back home, but Sasha refuses every time. Sasha then reveals that she and Julius share a secret of which the rest of the family isn't aware.

Sasha stops by the motel to visit Vivienne, but she has to run out to the store. While alone, Sasha and Julius continue their bickering. On December 21, during another argument, Sasha reminds Julius that they are father and daughter.

Sasha gets involved with Zende after he leaves Nicole, but no one accepts their relationship. After a confrontation with Nicole about Zende, Sasha reveals to her that they are half-sisters. Nicole refuses to accept her into the family, and Julius and Vivienne split up for a while when she realizes he had an affair with Sasha's mother.
 
When Nicole gives birth Rick and Maya's daughter, Lizzy, Zende decides to reunite with her. Knowing that Zende and Nicole are getting to back together, Sasha tells them that she is pregnant. She then confesses that she was lying and Zende dumps her. After a family meeting and much soul-searching, Nicole, Vivienne and Maya forgive Julius and Sasha for their lies.

Sasha continues her work at Forrester Creations and she gets closer to Thomas Forrester (Pierson Fodé) when he defends her from Julius' verbal attack and Sasha thanks Thomas with a kiss. Sasha and Thomas start to dating, but Nicole thinks Thomas still has feelings for his babymama, Caroline Spencer (Linsey Godfrey). When Caroline returns in town with Thomas' son, Douglas Forrester, wanting the three of them to be a family, Sasha ends things with Thomas, not wishing to stand between him and his child.

Sasha returns in Zende's orbit again when Maya and Rick want Nicole to carry a baby for them a second time. Sasha supports Zende, who doesn't approve at the idea of coming in second to Nicole's surrogacy again. Sasha gets a surprise trip to Hawaii when a drunk Zende whisks her away upon hearing that Nicole is going through with the surrogacy. On the plane ride home, Sasha and Zende kiss and then make love; but Nicole, who has changed her mind, catches them together. Sasha apologizes but defends Zende's position; when Nicole refuses Zende's repeated marriage proposals, Sasha tells Nicole she still wants Zende and asks him where things stand between them, but Zende clarifies his heart is with Nicole.

Months later, hearing Nicole has finally agreed to marry Zende, Sasha asks Nicole for forgiveness, wanting to be a family again. Nicole forgives her and Sasha attends at Nicole and Zende's wedding, watching them exchanged vows and gives them her blessing. Sasha later gets a job promotion and moves to Paris.

Others

References

External links
Characters and cast at the Official The Bold and the Beautiful website 
Characters and cast at the Internet Movie Database

Bold and the Beautiful
, 2015